In logic and computer science, the Boolean satisfiability problem (sometimes called propositional satisfiability problem and abbreviated SATISFIABILITY, SAT or B-SAT) is the problem of determining if there exists an interpretation that satisfies a given Boolean formula. In other words, it asks whether the variables of a given Boolean formula can be consistently replaced by the values TRUE or FALSE in such a way that the formula evaluates to TRUE. If this is the case, the formula is called satisfiable. On the other hand, if no such assignment exists, the function expressed by the formula is FALSE for all possible variable assignments and the formula is unsatisfiable. For example, the formula "a AND NOT b" is satisfiable because one can find the values a = TRUE and b = FALSE, which make (a AND NOT b) = TRUE. In contrast, "a AND NOT a" is unsatisfiable.

SAT is the first problem that was proved to be NP-complete; see Cook–Levin theorem. This means that all problems in the complexity class NP, which includes a wide range of natural decision and optimization problems, are at most as difficult to solve as SAT. There is no known algorithm that efficiently solves each SAT problem, and it is generally believed that no such algorithm exists; yet this belief has not been proved mathematically, and resolving the question of whether SAT has a polynomial-time algorithm is equivalent to the P versus NP problem, which is a famous open problem in the theory of computing.

Nevertheless, as of 2007, heuristic SAT-algorithms are able to solve problem instances involving tens of thousands of variables and formulas consisting of millions of symbols, which is sufficient for many practical SAT problems from, e.g., artificial intelligence, circuit design, and automatic theorem proving.

Definitions
A propositional logic formula, also called Boolean expression, is built from variables, operators AND (conjunction, also denoted by ∧), OR (disjunction, ∨), NOT (negation, ¬), and parentheses.
A formula is said to be satisfiable if it can be made TRUE by assigning appropriate logical values (i.e. TRUE, FALSE) to its variables.
The Boolean satisfiability problem (SAT) is, given a formula, to check whether it is satisfiable.
This decision problem is of central importance in many areas of computer science, including theoretical computer science, complexity theory, algorithmics, cryptography and artificial intelligence.

Conjunctive normal form

A literal is either a variable (in which case it is called a positive literal) or the negation of a variable (called a negative literal).
A clause is a disjunction of literals (or a single literal). A clause is called a Horn clause if it contains at most one positive literal.
A formula is in conjunctive normal form (CNF) if it is a conjunction of clauses (or a single clause).
For example,  is a positive literal,  is a negative literal,  is a clause. The formula is satisfiable, by choosing x1 = FALSE, x2 = FALSE, and x3 arbitrarily, since (FALSE ∨ ¬FALSE) ∧ (¬FALSE ∨ FALSE ∨ x3) ∧ ¬FALSE evaluates to (FALSE ∨ TRUE) ∧ (TRUE ∨ FALSE ∨ x3) ∧ TRUE, and in turn to TRUE ∧ TRUE ∧ TRUE (i.e. to TRUE). In contrast, the CNF formula a ∧ ¬a, consisting of two clauses of one literal, is unsatisfiable, since for a=TRUE or a=FALSE it evaluates to TRUE ∧ ¬TRUE (i.e., FALSE) or FALSE ∧ ¬FALSE (i.e., again FALSE), respectively.

For some versions of the SAT problem, it is useful to define the notion of a generalized conjunctive normal form formula, viz. as a conjunction of arbitrarily many generalized clauses, the latter being of the form  for some Boolean function R and (ordinary) literals . Different sets of allowed boolean functions lead to different problem versions. As an example, R(¬x,a,b) is a generalized clause, and R(¬x,a,b) ∧ R(b,y,c) ∧ R(c,d,¬z) is a generalized conjunctive normal form. This formula is used below, with R being the ternary operator that is TRUE just when exactly one of its arguments is.

Using the laws of Boolean algebra, every propositional logic formula can be transformed into an equivalent conjunctive normal form, which may, however, be exponentially longer. For example, transforming the formula
(x1∧y1) ∨ (x2∧y2) ∨ ... ∨ (xn∧yn)
into conjunctive normal form yields

;
while the former is a disjunction of n conjunctions of 2 variables, the latter consists of 2n clauses of n variables.

However, with use of the Tseytin transformation, we may find an equisatisfiable conjunctive normal form formula with length linear in the size of the original propositional logic formula.

Complexity

SAT was the first known NP-complete problem, as proved by Stephen Cook at the University of Toronto in 1971 and independently by Leonid Levin at the Russian Academy of Sciences in 1973. Until that time, the concept of an NP-complete problem did not even exist.
The proof shows how every decision problem in the complexity class NP can be reduced to the SAT problem for CNF formulas, sometimes called CNFSAT.
A useful property of Cook's reduction is that it preserves the number of accepting answers. For example, deciding whether a given graph has a 3-coloring is another problem in NP; if a graph has 17 valid 3-colorings, the SAT formula produced by the Cook–Levin reduction will have 17 satisfying assignments.

NP-completeness only refers to the run-time of the worst case instances.  Many of the instances that occur in practical applications can be solved much more quickly.  See Algorithms for solving SAT below.

3-satisfiability

Like the satisfiability problem for arbitrary formulas, determining the satisfiability of a formula in conjunctive normal form where each clause is limited to at most three literals is NP-complete also; this problem is called 3-SAT, 3CNFSAT, or 3-satisfiability.
To reduce the unrestricted SAT problem to 3-SAT, transform each clause  to a conjunction of  clauses

where  are fresh variables not occurring elsewhere.
Although the two formulas are not logically equivalent, they are equisatisfiable. The formula resulting from transforming all clauses is at most 3 times as long as its original, i.e. the length growth is polynomial.

3-SAT is one of Karp's 21 NP-complete problems, and it is used as a starting point for proving that other problems are also NP-hard. This is done by polynomial-time reduction from 3-SAT to the other problem. An example of a problem where this method has been used is the clique problem: given a CNF formula consisting of c clauses, the corresponding graph consists of a vertex for each literal, and an edge between each two non-contradicting literals from different clauses, cf. picture. The graph has a c-clique if and only if the formula is satisfiable.

There is a simple randomized algorithm due to Schöning (1999) that runs in time (4/3)n where n is the number of variables in the 3-SAT proposition, and succeeds with high probability to correctly decide 3-SAT.

The exponential time hypothesis asserts that no algorithm can solve 3-SAT (or indeed k-SAT for any ) in  time (i.e., fundamentally faster than exponential in n).

Selman, Mitchell, and Levesque (1996) give empirical data on the difficulty of randomly generated 3-SAT formulas, depending on their size parameters.
Difficulty is measured in number recursive calls made by a DPLL algorithm. They identified a phase transition region from almost certainly satisfiable to almost certainly unsatisfiable formulas at the clauses-to-variables ratio at about 4.26.

3-satisfiability can be generalized to k-satisfiability (k-SAT, also k-CNF-SAT), when formulas in CNF are considered with each clause containing up to k literals.
However, since for any k ≥ 3, this problem can neither be easier than 3-SAT nor harder than SAT, and the latter two are NP-complete, so must be k-SAT.

Some authors restrict k-SAT to CNF formulas with exactly k literals. This doesn't lead to a different complexity class either, as each clause  with j < k literals can be padded with fixed dummy variables to
.
After padding all clauses, 2k-1 extra clauses have to be appended to ensure that only  can lead to a satisfying assignment. Since k doesn't depend on the formula length, the extra clauses lead to a constant increase in length.

Special cases of SAT

Conjunctive normal form
Conjunctive normal form (in particular with 3 literals per clause) is often considered the canonical representation for SAT formulas. As shown above, the general SAT problem reduces to 3-SAT, the problem of determining satisfiability for formulas in this form.

Disjunctive normal form
SAT is trivial if the formulas are restricted to those in disjunctive normal form, that is, they are a disjunction of conjunctions of literals. Such a formula is indeed satisfiable if and only if at least one of its conjunctions is satisfiable, and a conjunction is satisfiable if and only if it does not contain both x and NOT x for some variable x. This can be checked in linear time. Furthermore, if they are restricted to being in full disjunctive normal form, in which every variable appears exactly once in every conjunction, they can be checked in constant time (each conjunction represents one satisfying assignment).  But it can take exponential time and space to convert a general SAT problem to disjunctive normal form; for an example exchange "∧" and "∨" in the above exponential blow-up example for conjunctive normal forms.

Exactly-1 3-satisfiability

A variant of the 3-satisfiability problem is the one-in-three 3-SAT (also known variously as 1-in-3-SAT and exactly-1 3-SAT).
Given a conjunctive normal form with three literals per clause, the problem is to determine whether there exists a truth assignment to the variables so that each clause has exactly one TRUE literal (and thus exactly two FALSE literals). In contrast, ordinary 3-SAT requires that every clause has at least one TRUE literal.
Formally, a one-in-three 3-SAT problem is given as a generalized conjunctive normal form with all generalized clauses using a ternary operator R that is TRUE just if exactly one of its arguments is. When all literals of a one-in-three 3-SAT formula are positive, the satisfiability problem is called one-in-three positive 3-SAT.

One-in-three 3-SAT, together with its positive case, is listed as NP-complete problem "LO4" in the standard reference, Computers and Intractability: A Guide to the Theory of NP-Completeness
by Michael R. Garey and David S. Johnson.  One-in-three 3-SAT was proved to be NP-complete by Thomas Jerome Schaefer as a special case of Schaefer's dichotomy theorem, which asserts that any problem generalizing Boolean satisfiability in a certain way is either in the class P or is NP-complete.

Schaefer gives a construction allowing an easy polynomial-time reduction from 3-SAT to one-in-three 3-SAT.  Let "(x or y or z)" be a clause in a 3CNF formula.  Add six fresh boolean variables a, b, c, d, e, and f, to be used to simulate this clause and no other.

Then the formula R(x,a,d) ∧ R(y,b,d) ∧ R(a,b,e) ∧ R(c,d,f) ∧ R(z,c,FALSE) is satisfiable by some setting of the fresh variables if and only if at least one of x, y, or z is TRUE, see picture (left).  Thus any 3-SAT instance with m clauses and n variables may be converted into an equisatisfiable one-in-three 3-SAT instance with 5m clauses and n+6m variables.
Another reduction involves only four fresh variables and three clauses: R(¬x,a,b) ∧ R(b,y,c) ∧ R(c,d,¬z), see picture (right).

Not-all-equal 3-satisfiability

Another variant is the not-all-equal 3-satisfiability problem (also called NAE3SAT).
Given a conjunctive normal form with three literals per clause, the problem is to determine if an assignment to the variables exists such that in no clause all three literals have the same truth value. This problem is NP-complete, too, even if no negation symbols are admitted, by Schaefer's dichotomy theorem.

Linear SAT 
A 3-SAT formula is Linear SAT (LSAT) if each clause (viewed as a set of literals) intersects at most one other clause, and, moreover, if two clauses intersect, then they have exactly one literal in common. An LSAT formula can be depicted as a set of disjoint semi-closed intervals on a line. Deciding whether an LSAT formula is satisfiable is NP-complete.

2-satisfiability

SAT is easier if the number of literals in a clause is limited to at most 2, in which case the problem is called 2-SAT. This problem can be solved in polynomial time, and in fact is complete for the complexity class NL. If additionally all OR operations in literals are changed to XOR operations, the result is called exclusive-or 2-satisfiability, which is a problem complete for the complexity class SL = L.

Horn-satisfiability

The problem of deciding the satisfiability of a given conjunction of Horn clauses is called Horn-satisfiability, or HORN-SAT.
It can be solved in polynomial time by a single step of the Unit propagation algorithm, which produces the single minimal model of the set of Horn clauses (w.r.t. the set of literals assigned to TRUE).
Horn-satisfiability is P-complete. It can be seen as P's version of the Boolean satisfiability problem.
Also, deciding the truth of quantified Horn formulas can be done in polynomial time.

Horn clauses are of interest because they are able to express implication of one variable from a set of other variables. Indeed, one such clause ¬x1 ∨ ... ∨ ¬xn ∨ y can be rewritten as x1 ∧ ... ∧ xn → y, that is, if x1,...,xn are all TRUE, then y needs to be TRUE as well.

A generalization of the class of Horn formulae is that of renameable-Horn formulae, which is the set of formulae that can be placed in Horn form by replacing some variables with their respective negation.
For example, (x1 ∨ ¬x2) ∧ (¬x1 ∨ x2 ∨ x3) ∧ ¬x1 is not a Horn formula, but can be renamed to the Horn formula (x1 ∨ ¬x2) ∧ (¬x1 ∨ x2 ∨ ¬y3) ∧ ¬x1 by introducing y3 as negation of x3.
In contrast, no renaming of (x1 ∨ ¬x2 ∨ ¬x3) ∧ (¬x1 ∨ x2 ∨ x3) ∧ ¬x1 leads to a Horn formula.
Checking the existence of such a replacement can be done in linear time; therefore, the satisfiability of such formulae is in P as it can be solved by first performing this replacement and then checking the satisfiability of the resulting Horn formula.

XOR-satisfiability

Another special case is the class of problems where each clause contains XOR (i.e. exclusive or) rather than (plain) OR operators.
This is in P, since an XOR-SAT formula can also be viewed as a system of linear equations mod 2, and can be solved in cubic time by Gaussian elimination; see the box for an example. This recast is based on the kinship between Boolean algebras and Boolean rings, and the fact that arithmetic modulo two forms a finite field. Since a XOR b XOR c evaluates to TRUE if and only if exactly 1 or 3 members of {a,b,c} are TRUE, each solution of the 1-in-3-SAT problem for a given CNF formula is also a solution of the XOR-3-SAT problem, and in turn each solution of XOR-3-SAT is a solution of 3-SAT, cf. picture. As a consequence, for each CNF formula, it is possible to solve the XOR-3-SAT problem defined by the formula, and based on the result infer either that the 3-SAT problem is solvable or that the 1-in-3-SAT problem is unsolvable.

Provided that the complexity classes P and NP are not equal, neither 2-, nor Horn-, nor XOR-satisfiability is NP-complete, unlike SAT.

Schaefer's dichotomy theorem

The restrictions above (CNF, 2CNF, 3CNF, Horn, XOR-SAT) bound the considered formulae to be conjunctions of subformulae; each restriction states a specific form for all subformulae: for example, only binary clauses can be subformulae in 2CNF.

Schaefer's dichotomy theorem states that, for any restriction to Boolean functions that can be used to form these subformulae, the corresponding satisfiability problem is in P or NP-complete.  The membership in P of the satisfiability of 2CNF, Horn, and XOR-SAT formulae are special cases of this theorem.

The following table summarizes some common variants of SAT.

Extensions of SAT
An extension that has gained significant popularity since 2003 is satisfiability modulo theories (SMT) that can enrich CNF formulas with linear constraints, arrays, all-different constraints, uninterpreted functions, etc. Such extensions typically remain NP-complete, but very efficient solvers are now available that can handle many such kinds of constraints.

The satisfiability problem becomes more difficult if both "for all" (∀) and "there exists" (∃) quantifiers are allowed to bind the Boolean variables.
An example of such an expression would be ; it is valid, since for all values of x and y, an appropriate value of z can be found, viz. z=TRUE if both x and y are FALSE, and z=FALSE else.
SAT itself (tacitly) uses only ∃ quantifiers.
If only ∀ quantifiers are allowed instead, the so-called tautology problem is obtained, which is co-NP-complete.
If both quantifiers are allowed, the problem is called the quantified Boolean formula problem (QBF), which can be shown to be PSPACE-complete. It is widely believed that PSPACE-complete problems are strictly harder than any problem in NP, although this has not yet been proved. Using highly parallel P systems, QBF-SAT problems can be solved in linear time.

Ordinary SAT asks if there is at least one variable assignment that makes the formula true. A variety of variants deal with the number of such assignments:
 MAJ-SAT asks if the majority of all assignments make the formula TRUE. It is known to be complete for PP, a probabilistic class.
 #SAT, the problem of counting how many variable assignments satisfy a formula, is a counting problem, not a decision problem, and is #P-complete.
 UNIQUE SAT is the problem of determining whether a formula has exactly one assignment. It is complete for US, the complexity class describing problems solvable by a non-deterministic polynomial time Turing machine that accepts when there is exactly one nondeterministic accepting path and rejects otherwise.
UNAMBIGUOUS-SAT is the name given to the satisfiability problem when the input is restricted to formulas having at most one satisfying assignment. The problem is also called USAT. A solving algorithm for UNAMBIGUOUS-SAT is allowed to exhibit any behavior, including endless looping, on a formula having several satisfying assignments. Although this problem seems easier, Valiant and Vazirani have shown that if there is a practical (i.e. randomized polynomial-time) algorithm to solve it, then all problems in NP can be solved just as easily.
 MAX-SAT, the maximum satisfiability problem, is an FNP generalization of SAT. It asks for the maximum number of clauses which can be satisfied by any assignment. It has efficient approximation algorithms, but is NP-hard to solve exactly. Worse still, it is APX-complete, meaning there is no polynomial-time approximation scheme (PTAS) for this problem unless P=NP.
WMSAT is the problem of finding an assignment of minimum weight that satisfy a monotone Boolean formula (i.e. a formula without any negation). Weights of propositional variables are given in the input of the problem. The weight of an assignment is the sum of weights of true variables. That problem is NP-complete (see Th. 1 of ).

Other generalizations include satisfiability for first- and second-order logic, constraint satisfaction problems, 0-1 integer programming.

Finding a satisfying assignment
While SAT is a decision problem, the search problem of finding a satisfying assignment reduces to SAT. That is, each algorithm which correctly answers if an instance of SAT is solvable can be used to find a satisfying assignment. First, the question is asked on the given formula Φ. If the answer is "no", the formula is unsatisfiable. Otherwise, the question is asked on the partly instantiated formula Φ{x1=TRUE}, i.e. Φ with the first variable x1 replaced by TRUE, and simplified accordingly. If the answer is "yes", then x1=TRUE, otherwise x1=FALSE. Values of other variables can be found subsequently in the same way. In total, n+1 runs of the algorithm are required, where n is the number of distinct variables in Φ.

This property is used in several theorems in complexity theory:

 NP ⊆ P/poly ⇒ PH = Σ2   (Karp–Lipton theorem)
 NP ⊆ BPP ⇒ NP = RP
 P = NP ⇒ FP = FNP

Algorithms for solving SAT

Since the SAT problem is NP-complete, only algorithms with exponential worst-case complexity are known for it. In spite of this, efficient and scalable algorithms for SAT were developed during the 2000s and have contributed to dramatic advances in our ability to automatically solve problem instances involving tens of thousands of variables and millions of constraints (i.e. clauses). Examples of such problems in electronic design automation (EDA) include formal equivalence checking, model checking, formal verification of pipelined microprocessors, automatic test pattern generation, routing of FPGAs, planning, and scheduling problems, and so on. A SAT-solving engine is also considered to be an essential component in the electronic design automation toolbox.

Major techniques used by modern SAT solvers include the Davis–Putnam–Logemann–Loveland algorithm (or DPLL), conflict-driven clause learning (CDCL), and stochastic local search algorithms such as WalkSAT. Almost all SAT solvers include time-outs, so they will terminate in reasonable time even if they cannot find a solution.
Different SAT solvers will find different instances easy or hard, and some excel at proving unsatisfiability, and others at finding solutions. Recent attempts have been made to learn an instance's satisfiability using deep learning techniques.

SAT solvers are developed and compared in SAT-solving contests. Modern SAT solvers are also having significant impact on the fields of software verification, constraint solving in artificial intelligence, and operations research, among others.

See also
Unsatisfiable core
Satisfiability modulo theories
Counting SAT
Planar SAT
Karloff–Zwick algorithm
Circuit satisfiability

Notes

External links 

 SAT Game: try solving a Boolean satisfiability problem yourself
 The international SAT competition website
 International Conference on Theory and Applications of Satisfiability Testing
 Journal on Satisfiability, Boolean Modeling and Computation
 SAT Live, an aggregate website for research on the satisfiability problem
 Yearly evaluation of MaxSAT solvers

References

Further reading
(by date of publication)

 
 
 
 
 
 
 
 
 

This article includes material from a column in the ACM SIGDA e-newsletter by Prof. Karem Sakallah Original text is available here

Boolean algebra
Electronic design automation
Formal methods
Logic in computer science
NP-complete problems
Satisfiability problems